Canal Bank and Trust was a commercial bank in New Orleans, Louisiana.

History
Canal Bank and Trust was formed by the 1919 merger of Commercial Trust and Savings Bank and Canal Bank. It was renamed Canal Bank and Trust Company on January 1, 1926.

Presidents
George Ogden (1831-1841)
Glendy Burke (1841-1849) 
Rathbone (1859?)
George B. Jonas (1866?-1877)
Joseph Chandler Morris (1877-??)

Mergers and acquisition time-line
New Orleans Canal and Banking Company, March 5, 1831.
Canal Bank of New Orleans, November 22, 1895
Canal Bank and Trust Company, August 11, 1903
Canal-Louisiana Bank and Trust Company, October, 1905
Canal Bank and Trust Company, January 1, 1914
Canal-Commercial Trust and Savings Bank, 1919
Canal Bank and Trust Company, January 1, 1926

Archive
The Canal Bank and Trust papers are archived at Tulane University.

References

Banks based in Louisiana
Defunct banks of the United States